Prochlidonia is a genus of moths belonging to the family Tortricidae.

Species
Prochlidonia amiantana (Hubner, [1796-1799])
Prochlidonia ochromixtana (Kennel, 1913)

See also
List of Tortricidae genera

References

 , 1960, Polskie Pismo Ent. 30: 30
 , 2011: Diagnoses and remarks on genera of Tortricidae, 2: Cochylini (Lepidoptera: Tortricidae). Shilap Revista de Lepidopterologia 39 (156): 397–414.
 ,2005 World Catalogue of Insects, 6

External links
tortricidae.com

Cochylini
Tortricidae genera